Livestream shopping (also known as live video shopping) is used by brands to promote and sell products through livestreams on digital platforms, often in collaboration with influencers.

The aim is to provide consumers with an immersive and interactive experience, allowing them to ask questions and buy products during the livestream.

It started in Asia in 2017 and then expanded to the rest of the world over the following years.

Terminology & phenomenon 
Live streaming is a type of streaming that allows, through the Internet, to transmit or receive a particular content while the event is taking place: in this case the event is a live presentation of a product followed by consumers from different locations. 

Livestream shopping consists, indeed, in livestreams on digital platforms (e-commerce) or social media (Facebook, Instagram etc. ) in which an influencer promotes a product or a brand. While the influencer promotes, people can watch these livestreams and they can ask questions live, they can chat or buy products from the shop. In this way, the activity of shopping is translated from offline into the digital world. 

The aim is to make sure that consumers get completely involved in the live sale that may take place on the other side of the world, without the necessity of being there physically.

Other terminology for the same phenomenon:

 shopstream;
 livestream e-commerce

Shopping in contemporary society

Influencers and their contemporary role 
The Internet has had a considerable impact in many spheres, including communication and consumerism and it is considered to be one of the most influential media and a key element in globalisation.

The arrival of social networks has changed the behaviour of consumers, connecting users and making them participate and active, prosumers, both consumers and content producers.

In this context the concept of e-marketing, or digital marketing, has made its way, that is applying the concepts of marketing through the internet technology. Kotler states that the electronic marketing is "the effort of the company to inform, advertise and sell products and services via the Internet". This new type of marketing allows to identify a more precise target, customizing the experience of each user making it more dynamic. Segmentation is a very useful tool for directly targeting consumers who, thanks to the Internet, are increasingly informed and therefore it becomes more difficult to attract them through traditional media.

Social media has transformed communication, allowing interaction and engagement between members of a community through messages, sharing photos and videos in real time and globally. This environment allows the consumer to create and share creative, informative and fun contents. The media therefore offers an opportunity for companies to reach new markets and new broad customer targets.

The concept of digital marketing gives rise to several subcategories, including influencer marketing. Celebrities have always been used to promote contents, increase brand awareness or brand perception. In influencer marketing, however, celebrities are chosen from the world of social media, which, thanks to their knowledge, skills or personality,can become online opinion leaders and thus influence directly or indirectly the decisions of consumers. "Influencer marketing is the virtue and the science of engaging people who have influence on the Internet to spread the message of a specific trend and its targeted audience in the form of sponsored content". Therefore, influencers can help to attract new potential consumers, create brand awareness and improve the brand image. Choosing influencers with the right persona and matching picture style is crucial. Whether the influencer can influence users, i.e., whether they have private domain traffic, they must have loyal fans. The anchor, the user, and the goods are based on the interaction of the scene and need to form a "field" following the established script-controlled plot, leading to many transactions.

Consumers tend to perceive the messages advertised by influencers as more reliable and convincing than conventional advertising, thus ensuring a higher economic return (ROI) for companies. In fact, influencer marketing is based on the confidence and trust of consumers acquired by the opinion leaders  over time.

Pandemic boost 
The COVID-19 pandemic and the consequent lockdowns had a significant impact on the use of social networks and consumption. The ephemeral content in particular was consumed more during the pandemic. This fact has been exploited by marketers to reach and connect to consumers, being the only way to communicate with them.

Brands have therefore tried and are trying to adapt to this decisive change. In China, since live commerce had a significant boost during the pandemic, consumers have found  livestream shopping as an important interactive experience.

Value and volume 
According to Alibaba, the largest online retailer in China, the sale worth from its live-streaming commerce business during the Single’s Day Shopping Festival hit ca.20-billion-yuan (ca. $3 million) in November 2019. 

In 2020 the number of live streaming consumers in China reached 526 million. Moreover, the rivalry was not only among livestreaming ecommerces but also among influencers on social media (like TikTok). 

Livestream shopping represents a bridge between entertainment and online shopping, that's why this phenomenon has the huge potential to become the new norm for e-commerce in China.

See also 

 Online shopping
 Livestreaming
 Internet television
 Digital marketing
 E-commerce

References 

Live streaming services
E-commerce